Terrence J. McKenrick is a retired United States Army major general who last served as the Deputy Commanding General of the V Corps. Previously, he served as the Commanding General of the First Army Division East.

References

External links
 

Year of birth missing (living people)
Living people
Place of birth missing (living people)
United States Army generals